Tiffy is a nickname for the Hawker Typhoon, a British single-seat fighter-bomber.

Tifi, Tiffi, or Tiffy may also refer to:

People
 Timothy Findley (1930–2002), Canadian novelist and playwright nicknamed "Tiffy"
 Søren "Tiffi" Nielsen, ice hockey player in SønderjyskE Ishockey
 Tifi Odasi, 15th century Italian poet
 Michael Torrens-Spence (1914–2001), Second World War Royal Navy Fleet Air Arm pilot nicknamed "Tiffy"
 Robert Tiffi, writer and director of the 2003 film Hatchetman

Fictional characters
 Tiffy Gerhardt, a character from the television show The Unit
 Tiffany "Tiffi" Krohn, a character in the film I'm Losing You played by Aria Curzon
 Tiffi, the mascot main character of Candy Crush Saga
 Tifi, in the 1958 film Hercules
 Tiffy, a pink female bird character in Sesamstraße, the German-language version of Sesame Street
 Tiffy, in the 2013 German–Austrian film Zur Sache, Macho!
 Tiffy Tootle, a character in the animated series Willa's Wild Life

Other uses
 Tifi, a river that flows through Akkuş, Ordu Province, Turkey
 Tifi, a type of clothing top worn by the women in Guam
 Taiwan Industrial Fastener Institute, co-organizes the Taiwan International Fastener Show
 The Tiffy, armed-forces artificer

See also
 Tiffy Titan, Amorphophallus titanum, flowering plant
 Tiffy Template, a template for the blind to identify Indian currency notes, created and named after Tiffany Brar
 "Sick Berth Tiffies", nickname for sick berth personnel in the Royal Navy
 TIFFE (disambiguation)
 River Tiffey, Norfolk, England 
 Terry Tiffee, baseball player

Lists of people by nickname